Pascal Diethelm (born 1 December 1944) is a Swiss econometrician and tobacco control activist who is the president of the anti-smoking organization OxyRomandie. He formerly worked at the World Health Organization (WHO) from 1970 until his retirement in 1999.

Career 

At the WHO, he developed a database to monitor smoking prevalence rates around the world. When he retired from the WHO, he was its headquarters chief of networking and telecommunications in Geneva, Switzerland. In the 2000s, while working at the University of Geneva, Diethelm discovered that the Swedish scientist Ragnar Rylander had been serving as a secret consultant to the tobacco company Philip Morris since the 1970s. Diethelm, along with his colleague Jean-Charles Rielle, were subsequently sued for libel by Rylander after they accused him of "scientific cheating without precedent". The case was ultimately appealed to the Federal Supreme Court of Switzerland before finally being decided in Diethelm's and Rielle's favor.

Publications

Articles 
 See Pubmed

Books 
 Pascal Diethelm and Martin McKee, Lifting the Smokescreen: Tobacco industry strategy to defeat smoke free policies and legislation, European Respiratory Society and French National Cancer Institute, 2006.

References

Bibliography 
 

1944 births
Living people
Swiss health activists
World Health Organization officials
Anti-smoking activists
Academic staff of the University of Geneva
Econometricians
Swiss economists
Swiss officials of the United Nations